Mai Kaen is the southeasternmost district (amphoe) of Pattani province, southern Thailand.

History
The minor district (king amphoe) Mae Kaen was formed on 15 November 1973 by splitting the two tambons Sai Thong and Mai Kaen from Sai Buri district. On 4 July 1994 it was upgraded to a full district.

Geography
Neighboring districts are (from the south clockwise): Mueang Narathiwat and Bacho of Narathiwat province and Sai Buri of Pattani Province. To the east is the Gulf of Thailand.

Administration
The district is divided into four sub-districts (tambons), which are further subdivided into 17 villages (mubans). There are no municipal (thesabans). There are three tambon administrative organizations (TAO).

References

External links
amphoe.com

Districts of Pattani province